Ustad Bismillah Khan Yuva Puraskar is an annual Indian award given by the Sangeet Natak Akademi to outstanding artists under 40 who have demonstrated talent in the fields of music, dance and drama. The award is intended to provide national recognition to the artists in the early years of their careers. Every year up to 33 artists are selected. The award has been conferred since 2006.

Recipients

Theatre

Play writing 
2016 - Manish Joshi 
 2017 - Kuldeep Kunal

Theatre direction 

 2012- Nalini Nihar Nayak
2018 - Dr. Chavan Pramod R.

Acting 
2018 - Namrata Sharma
2018 - Sunil Palwal
2018 - Preeti Jha Tiwari
2012 - Happy Ranajit

Traditional theatre 
2016 - Jayachandra Varma Rekandar

Dance

Bharatnatyam 

2006 - Sheejith Krishna
2007 - C. Lavanya Ananth
2008 - Gayatri Balagurunathan
2009 - Ragini Chander Shekar
2010 - Praveen Kumar
2011 - Meenakshi Srinivasan
2012 - Uma Sathya Narayanan
2014 - Lavanya Sankar, Lakshmi Parthasarathy Athreya
2015 - Shijith Nambiar & Parvathi Menon (Joint Award)
2016 - Jyotsna Jagannathan
2017 - Parshwanath Upadhye
2018 - Renjith & Vijna
2019 - Sudipa Ghosh
2020 - Mithun Shyam
2021 - Pavitra Krishna Bhat

Chhau 

2011 - Dilip Chandra Mahato
2014 - Satish Kumar Modak, Lokanath Das

Kathakali 

2006 - Kalamandalam Pradeep Kumar
2007 - Kalamandalam Shanmukhadas C
2008 - Vijay Kumar N
2010 - M. Amaljith
2011 - Renjini K. P.
2012 - Kalamandalam Harinarayanan.A
2014 - Kalamandalam Arun Warrier
2015 - Thulasi kumar Sudhakaran
2017 - C.M. Unnikrishnan

Kathak 

2006 - Prashant Shah
2007 - Sharvari Ashok Jamenis
2008 - Gauri Diwakar
2009 - Monisa Nayak
2010 - Pallabi De
2011 - Namrata Pamnani
2012 - Anuj Mishra
2014 - Souvik Chakraborty, Sandeep Mahavir
2015 - Vishal Krishna, Divya Goswami Dikshit
2016 - Sanjukta Sinha
2017 - Vidha Lal 
2018 - Durgesh Gangani
2021 - Rudra Shankar Mishra

Kuchipudi 

2006 - Vedantam Venkata Nagachalapathi Rao
2007 - Yamini Reddy
2008 - Arunima Kumar
2009 - Chinta Ravi Balakrishna
2010 - Yeleswarapu Srinivasulu
2011 - Kuravi Venkata Subrahmanya Prasad
2012 - Vedantam Satya Narasimha Sastry
2014 - Prateeksha Kashi, Mosalikanti Jaikishore
2015 - Boby Chakraborty
2016 - Pasumarthi Mruthyunjaya
2017 - Bhavana Reddy 
2021 - Avijit Das

Manipuri 

2006 - Sijagurumayum Nimita Devi
2007 - Laishram Bina Devi
2008 - Bimbavati Devi
2009 - Hanlem Indu Devi
2011 - Gurumayum Chandan Devi
2012 - Sinam Basu Singh
2015 - Pukhrambam Bilash Singh
2016 - Sanjenbam Karuna Devi
2017 - Adhikarimayum Radhamanbi Devi
2018 - Dr Manju Elangbam

Mohiniattam 

2007 - Methil Devika
2009 - Manjula B. Murthy
2014 - Saji Menon
2016 - Kalamandalam Rachitha Ravi
2020 - Rekha Raju - Overall contribution to performing arts

Odissi 

2006 - Bijayini Satpathy, Leena Mohanty
2007 - Madhusmita Mohanty
2008 - Rahul Acharya
2009 - Lingaraj Pradhan
2010 - Arushi Mudgal
2011 - Sonali Mohapatra
2012 - Yudhisthir Nayak
2014 - Rajashri Prahraj
2016 - Shashwati Garai Ghosh
2017 - Janhabi Behera 
2018 - Madhulita Mohapatra

Sattriya 

2008 - Meerananda Barthakur
2009 - Menaka P.P. Bora
2010 - Naren Barua
2012 - Bhabananda Barbayan
2014 - Mridusmita Das, Anwesa Mahanta
2015 - Seujpriya Borthakur
2016 - Usharani Baishya

Contemporary / Experimental dance 

2010 - Madhu Nataraj
2012 - Preethi Balachandran Athreya
2014 - Vikram Iyengar
2015 - Shilpika Bordoloi
2017 - Sudesh Adhana

Other major traditions of dance and theatre 

2008 - Purvadhanshree (Vilasini Natyam)
2014 - Sangeeth Chakyar (Kutiyattam)

Music

Carnatic

Flute

2020 - Amith Nadig

Hindustani

Sitar
 2018 - Dhruv Bedi

Vocal 

2012 - Kumar Mardur, Bhuvanesh Komkali
2016 - Koushik Aithal, Yashasvi Sirpotkar
2007- Sandeep Deshmukh

Tabla 

2015 - Anubrata Chatterjee

Sarod 

2016 - Abir hussain

Folk music 

2017 -Sarbeswar Bhoi
Creative and experimental music

 2009 - Anil Srinivasan

Puppetry 
2006 - Anurupa Roy (Delhi)
2008 - Sudarshan K.V (Kerala)
2012 - Moumita Adak (West Bengal)
2014 - Mohammad Shameem (Delhi)
2014 - Shreeparna Gupta (West Bengal)
2015 - Choiti Ghosh (Delhi)
2016 - Rajeev Pulavar (Kerala)
2016 - S Gopi (Tamilnadu)
2018 - Chandni Zala (Gujarat)

Other traditional / Folk / Tribal dance / Music 

 2018 - Chandan Tiwari (Folk Music, Bihar)
 2018 - Dinesh Kumar Jangde ( Panthi Dance, Chhattisgarh)
 2018 - Manoj Kumar Das (Traditional Music [Khol], Assam)
 2018 - A. Aneshori Devi (Traditional & Folk Music, Manipur)
 2018 - P. Rajkumar (Folk Dance, Tamil Nadu)
 2018 - Madhushree Hatial (Folk Music [Jhumar], West Bengal)
 2018 - Ashok Kumar (Folk Music, Uttar Pradesh)

Controversies 
In 2018, Amaan Ali Khan and Ayaan Ali Khan, sons of Amjad Ali Khan, and both then above 35, were selected for the 2017 award in their respective fields, but refused the award stating that it should be awarded to younger musicians.

References

External links 

Indian awards
 01